BBC Radio Bristol is the BBC's local radio station serving the former county of Avon which is composed of the unitary authorities of Bath and North East Somerset, Bristol, North Somerset and South Gloucestershire.

It broadcasts on FM, DAB, digital TV and via BBC Sounds from studios at Broadcasting House in Bristol.

According to RAJAR, the station has a weekly audience of 107,000 listeners and a 3.0% share as of December 2022.

Overview
BBC Radio Bristol broadcasts on FM frequencies 94.9 MHz (Dundry), 104.6 MHz (Bath), 103.6 MHz (Weston-super-Mare), and on DAB. The AM transmitter at Mangotsfield on 1548 kHz was closed in February 2016.

The Mendip transmitter, near Wells, used to broadcast BBC Radio Bristol on 95.5 MHz over a very large area but, from 3 December 2007, this was transferred to the new BBC Somerset service. Since the BBC relaunched BBC Somerset on FM, BBC Radio Bristol has been left free to concentrate editorially on Bristol, Bath and the rest of the former Avon area. On 11 December 2014, BBC Radio Bristol launched on Freeview channel 719, on the PSB 1 multiplex from the Mendip transmitter and its TV relays.

Radio Bristol's main commercial competitors in its broadcast area are Heart West on 96.3 and 103 FM, Hits Radio (Bristol and the South West) on 106.5 FM and Greatest Hits Radio Bristol and The South West on 107.2, 107.7 and 107.9 MHz.

Programming
Local programming is produced and broadcast from the BBC's Bristol studios from 6am - 10pm each day.

The weekday late show, airing from 10pm-1am, originates from sister station BBC Radio Gloucestershire and goes out to  the BBC West region. At weekends, the late show originates from BBC Radio Cornwall in Truro on a Saturday and BBC Radio Devon in Plymouth on Sunday. BBC Introducing in the West is presented from BBC Radio Wiltshire Swindon studios.

During the station's downtime, BBC Radio Bristol simulcasts overnight programming from BBC Radio 5 Live and BBC Radio London.

Presenters
Notable current presenters include:

Geoff Twentyman

Notable past presenters
Kate Adie and Michael Buerk produced and presented programmes for BBC Radio Bristol as part of the station's launch team in the 1970s – Buerk's voice was also the very first to be heard on the station.

Another notable presenter during the early 1970s was Kenny Everett, who pre-recorded his shows from his farmhouse in Sussex.

The comedian Chris Morris worked for the station in the late 1980s, presenting and producing his own weekend show, No Known Cure. He was dismissed from the station after "talking over the news bulletins and making silly noises".

One of the station's longest serving presenters was veteran local journalist Roger Bennett, who joined at launch as a reporter, before going onto present its flagship breakfast programme, Morning West, from 1974 to 2003. He continued to freelance at Radio Bristol until his death in July 2005.

Other past presenters include Susan Osman who also co-presented Points West for 14 years, and John Turner, who spent almost 30 years on the station between 1978 and 2007.

The presenter of BBC Radio 4's Woman's Hour, Jenni Murray, started her BBC career with Radio Bristol, as did the Good Morning Britain presenter Susanna Reid.

John Howard, who produced and co-wrote the station's award-winning 1979 comedy programme That Was The West That Was,  was a regular presenter on the station in the late 1970s and went on to be one of the main presenters of You and Yours on BBC Radio 4.

The doctor and comedian Dr Phil Hammond presented a Saturday morning show called Saturday Surgery for 12 years, but was taken off air in August 2018 after announcing his intention to stand for Parliament.

Controversy 

In November 2008, BBC Radio Bristol presenter Sam Mason was dismissed following an incident in which it was alleged that she had made racist remarks  in an off-air phone conversation during a weekday afternoon show. Whilst phoning a taxi firm in order to send her 14-year-old daughter from Mason's Clifton home to her grandparents' home, she was said to have asked the company not to send an Asian driver.

References

External links 
 

1970 establishments in England
Bristol
Mass media in Bath, Somerset
Organisations based in Bristol
Radio stations established in 1970
Radio stations in Bristol
Radio stations in Somerset